Wehl is a railway station located in Wehl, Netherlands. The station was opened in 15 July 1885 and is located on the Winterswijk–Zevenaar railway. The train services are operated by Arriva and Breng.

Train services

Bus services

Other features 
The station also has bike sheds, parking, and bike lockers.

Controversy 
The Station's name was initially German, much to the chagrin of the locals. When the station was opened in 1885, Wehl citizens protested, and the name was changed to dutch.

References

External links
NS website 
Arriva website 
Dutch Public Transport journey planner 

Railway stations in Doetinchem
Railway stations opened in 1885